Öpfingen is a municipality in the district of Alb-Donau in Baden-Württemberg in Germany.

Local council
Since the election in May 2014 the council has 10 members.

References

Towns in Baden-Württemberg
Alb-Donau-Kreis
Württemberg